Neuhausen is a railway station served by S-Bahn services in the municipality of Neuhausen am Rheinfall, in the Swiss canton of Schaffhausen.

Location
The railway station is located at the junction of the Rheinfall line and the Eglisau to Neuhausen line, next to the River Rhine at the eastern end of the town of Neuhausen am Rheinfall.

Train services
The railway station is served by Zurich S-Bahn lines S9, S12, S24 and S33, and by a Schaffhausen S-Bahn line (operated by THURBO):

 Zürich S-Bahn:
 :

Bus services

The railway station is served by municipal bus line 7 of Verkehrsbetriebe Schaffhausen (vbsh). The bus stop next to the railway station is called Neuhausen SBB. It is the southern terminus of line 7.

Border
Until December 2010 the next station in the direction towards Bülach, was Altenburg-Rheinau, located in Altenburg, part of Jestetten, in Germany, close to the border with Switzerland. However, despite protests from the German authorities, the station was closed by the Swiss due to low passenger numbers.

Until the opening of Neuhausen Rheinfall railway station in December 2015, Neuhausen station was a border station for customs purposes. Customs checks could be performed aboard trains and in Neuhausen station by Swiss officials. Systematic passport controls were abolished when Switzerland joined the Schengen Area in 2008.

Collision

A train collision occurred on Thursday 10 January 2013, at 8:47 CET on the Winterthur-Schaffhausen line, about 250 meters away from the station. Two trains, the S33 and the former S11 peak-hour service, collided head-on and derailed. There were twenty-six injuries. Nine had to be taken to hospital, but there were no serious injuries. Among the people hospitalised were the two drivers.

Gallery

References

External links
 
Sciaffusa

Railway stations in the canton of Schaffhausen
Swiss Federal Railways stations
Neuhausen am Rheinfall
2013 in Switzerland
Railway accidents in 2013
2013 disasters in Switzerland
Train collisions in Switzerland